The Jazz Giants '56 is an album by saxophonist Lester Young, issued in 1956 on Verve Records.

Track listing
 "I Guess I'll Have To Change My Plan" (Arthur Schwartz, Howard Dietz) - 9:35
 "I Didn't Know What Time It Was" (Richard Rodgers, Lorenz Hart) - 10:06
 "Gigantic Blues" (Lester Young) - 6:54
 "This Year's Kisses" (Irving Berlin) - 6:49
 "You Can Depend on Me" (Charles Carpenter, Louis Dunlap, Earl Hines) - 9:06

Personnel
 Lester Young – saxophone
 Roy Eldridge – trumpet
 Vic Dickenson – trombone
 Teddy Wilson – piano
 Freddie Green – guitar
 Gene Ramey – bass
 Jo Jones – drums

References

1956 albums
Lester Young albums
Verve Records albums